SM UB-18 was a German Type UB II submarine or U-boat in the German Imperial Navy during World War I. The U-boat was ordered on 30 April 1915 and launched on 21 August 1915. She was commissioned into the German Imperial Navy on 11 December 1915 as SM UB-18.

Design
A German Type UB II submarine, ‘’UB-18’’  had a displacement of  when at the surface and  while submerged. The submarine was powered by two Daimler six-cylinder four-stroke diesel engines each producing  (a total of ), two Siemens-Schuckert electric motors producing , and one  propeller shaft.

UB-18 was fitted with two  torpedo tubes in the bow, four torpedoes, and one  Tk L/40 deck gun. Her complement was twenty-three crew members.

Service history
Oberleutnant zur See (Oblt.z.S.) Franz Wäger took command of UB-18 upon commissioning on 11 December 1915. Wäger handed over command to Oblt.z.S. Otto Steinbrinck, who sailed her to Zeebrugge, arriving on 16 February, the first U-boat of the type to be based there.

1st War Patrol
At the end of February 1916, UB-18 left Zeebrugge for the approaches to Le Havre. On 26 February she launched a torpedo hitting the French steamer , whose sinking was not observed. The attack on the French auxiliary minesweeper Au Revoir was more successful, sinking the 20-year-old ship of 1,058 GRT, killing 18 crew members. UB-18 returned to base arriving there 29 February 1916.

2nd War Patrol
On 4 March 1916 UB-18 provided flank cover for a German fleet sortie against the English east coast.

3rd War Patrol
From 7–11 March 1916, UB-18 operated against Allied shipping off Boulogne and Le Havre. On 8 March, she sunk a British steamer, and the following day, a Norwegian freighter, the Silius, and a French steamer, fell victims to UB-18s torpedoes.

4th War Patrol
On 21 March 1916, UB-18 left Zeebrugge again for the Le Havre area, where she successfully attacked ships lying in the roads. Two ships, the British freighter , and the Norwegian steamer  were hit by torpedoes and sank. The two reloads did not show any hits. UB-18 returned to Zeebrugge, arriving on 29 March 1916.
That day, the Flanders Flotilla was formed, and Steinbrinck was awarded the coveted Pour le Mérite order.

Loss
Early on the morning of 9 December she inadvertently surfaced close to the trawler Ben Lawer, which was escorting a coal convoy. The trawler immediately rammed her just aft of the conning tower, sinking her; there were no survivors. The impact was substantial, with the Ben Lawer so badly damaged that she only just made port.

Summary of raiding history

Notes

References

Bibliography 

 

German Type UB II submarines
U-boats commissioned in 1915
World War I submarines of Germany
Maritime incidents in 1917
U-boats sunk in 1917
U-boats sunk by British warships
1915 ships
Ships built in Hamburg
Ships lost with all hands